Bear Creek is an approximately  tributary of the Santa Ana River in the San Bernardino Mountains of the U.S. state of California.

Course
The course of Bear Creek is entirely contained within San Bernardino County, and primarily within the San Bernardino National Forest.

It rises near the community of Woodlands, and flows north into Baldwin Lake in the eastern . From there it flows west past the town of town of Big Bear City and the  city of Big Bear Lake into Bear Valley, where since 1912 it has been impounded by a dam to form Big Bear Lake reservoir.

Downstream of the dam it receives Siberia Creek from the left, and plunges suddenly into a steep and narrow canyon, and empties into the Santa Ana River just upstream of Seven Oaks Dam, which in wet years, impounds water on the Santa Ana River past the Bear Creek confluence.

See also
List of tributaries of the Santa Ana River
List of rivers of California

References

Rivers of San Bernardino County, California
Tributaries of the Santa Ana River
Big Bear Valley
San Bernardino Mountains
San Bernardino National Forest
Rivers of Southern California